1,8-Diaminonaphthalene is an organic compound with the formula CH(NH).  It is one of several isomeric naphthalenediamines.  It is a colorless solid that darkens in air due to oxidation. It is a precursor to commercial pigments.

Synthesis and reactions

It is prepared by reduction of 1,8-dinitronaphthalene, which in turn is obtained as a mixture of isomers by nitration of 1-nitronaphthalene.

Upon treatment with phthalic anhydride derivatives, the diamine converts to phthaloperinones. The derivative from phthalic anhydride itself, Solvent Orange 60, is a useful orange pigment. It is a precursor to 1,8-bis(dimethylamino)naphthalene. This compound used to produce perimidines by various aldehydes.

See also
 C10H10N2

References

Naphthylamines
Diamines